Development and Peace-Caritas Canada (French: Développement et Paix) is the official international development arm of the Catholic Church in Canada. It is a member of Caritas Internationalis, CIDSE, the Halifax Initiative and many other networks. Through its membership in the Canadian Foodgrains Bank, Development and Peace is also connected to the Humanitarian Coalition, a coalition of Canadian non-governmental organizations that partner with the Government of Canada, and mobilize media, businesses and individual Canadians to raise money in response to humanitarian catastrophes around the world.

History
Development and Peace was established in 1967 by the Canadian Conference of Catholic Bishops in response to Pope Paul VI's encyclical letter Populorum Progressio, which says that Development is the new word for Peace. Peace is not simply the absence of warfare, based on a precarious balance of power. It must be built daily, and it must strive towards a more perfect justice among human beings (Populorum Progressio, 65). Along with the other principles of Catholic social teaching, that founding principle still guides Development and Peace today.

Members

Development and Peace has 10,600 members (volunteers) across Canada. They contribute to educating the Canadian public and Canadian politicians about social justice and international development issues. They organise fundraisers and participate in the governance of the organisation. Members elect representatives to the National Council and its various committees. Currently, the President of the National Council is Evelyne Beaudoin, member of Development and Peace from Manitoba.

In addition to a head office in Montreal and satellite offices in Toronto and Ottawa, Development and Peace has 9 small regional offices staffed by Animators, who train and empower members as agents of change. Development and Peace welcomes volunteers of all faiths to join the movement to build a world of justice.

International Programs

The organisation's regular programming spans 33 countries in Africa, Asia, Latin America and the Middle East. Individual projects are proposed by partner organisations - generally local non-governmental organisations or social movements. The programs and projects are meant to support the poor as they improve their living conditions in a sustainable way and increase their participation in their country's development.

Several times a year, program officers from Development and Peace's main office in Montreal, Quebec, visit the partners to evaluate progress, provide training and resources, foster networking between organisations and plan future activities.

Emergency Relief

Development and Peace's emergency program exists for one purpose: to provide aid to needy individuals and communities. Much of this work is done through Caritas Internationalis, one of the world's largest humanitarian aid networks.

Education Campaigns

Each year, beginning in the fall, members of Development and Peace organise an education campaign within Canada in parishes, schools and communities. The campaign invites Catholics and the Canadian public to take action for change. Members of the organisation believe that Canadians of all religious beliefs have a responsibility to help the world's poor and disadvantaged, either by urging governments, corporations and others to implement change, or by donating time or money to support development efforts. Part of the Development and Peace philosophy is that, with the proper social and economic tools, people in the Global South can lead lives rich in human dignity.

In 2007 and 2008, Development and Peace's annual campaign focused on holding Canadian mining companies accountable for their operations abroad. There are often little to no repercussions for Canadian companies which violate human rights and destroy the environment due to lax laws and poor enforcement of environmental protections in developing countries. Since the beginning of the campaign, over 200,000 Canadians have sent postcards to the Canadian government asking that it legislate corporate social responsibility.

Since 1994, Development and Peace has also been a member of the Halifax Initiative, a coalition of Canadian non-governmental organizations for public interest work and education on international financial institutions.

Share Lent Campaigns

Share Lent is the annual fundraising campaign of the Canadian Catholic Organization for Development and Peace. It helps support Development and Peace partners in their local work with communities in Africa, Asia, Latin America and the Middle East.

See also
 Caritas Internationalis
The Humanitarian Coalition
CIDSE
Halifax Initiative

References

Development charities based in Canada